is a sports video game developed by Sega AM3 and published by Sega for arcades in 1997, and for the Sega Saturn in 1998, featuring the license for the 1998 Winter Olympics that were celebrated in Nagano, Japan. It is the sequel to the 1996 Sega game DecAthlete. Winter Heat was released on the PlayStation 2 in Japan as part of the DecAthlete Collection with DecAthlete and Virtua Athlete. The collection is the 15th volume of the Sega Ages 2500 series.

Gameplay
Like Decathlete, Winter Heat features a number of different events to play in, most of them revolving around rapid button pressing and timed button taps.

Reception

The Sega Saturn version was positively received by critics, and held a 78% on the review aggregation website GameRankings based on four reviews. Critics widely praised the simple and natural controls, and the attractive and well-animated high resolution graphics. GameSpot explained that "Despite its simplicity and the immediate potential for carpal tunnel syndrome, Winter Heat succeeds at providing a fun and varied batch of snowy competitions. It does this by employing fairly consistent controls through a varied series of games. The speed button remains the speed button throughout, and so on. As a result, it's not such a headache to go from one competition to the next, and the package is tied together better than the competition's."

GamePro called it "a fun, finger-jamming winter sports game". Sega Saturn Magazine criticized the bordered display on the PAL conversion, but said the three Saturn-exclusive events are as good or better than the eight events of the arcade version, which in conjunction with the four-player capability gives the game enough longevity to stand up as a console game. GameSpot and Sega Saturn Magazine both also gave particular praise to the sense of speed in the bobsled event. John Ricciardi of Electronic Gaming Monthly (EGM) remarked that "Winter Heat is far and away the best of this year's Winter Olympics-style games. Each event requires different techniques with the control pad, and they're all a lot of fun." EGM gave Winter Heat their "Game of the Month" award, with three of the four members of their review team giving it a 9 out of 10 or better.

Notes

References

External links
 
 

1997 video games
1998 Winter Olympics
Arcade video games
Multiplayer and single-player video games
Sega-AM3 games
Sega arcade games
Sega Saturn games
Sega video games
Snowboarding video games
Sports video games set in Japan
Video game sequels
Video games set in 1998
Video games set in Nagano (city)
Winter Olympic video games
Video games developed in Japan